The 2001 UIAA Climbing World Championships, the 6th edition, were held in Winterthur, Switzerland from 5 to 8 September 2001. It was organized by the Union Internationale des Associations d'Alpinisme (UIAA). The championships consisted of lead, speed, and bouldering events. Bouldering was added as a new event.

Medalists

Schedule

Lead

Men 
The 18-year-old Frenchman Gérome Pouvreau won the Lead World Champion title. Tomáš Mrázek, although reached Pouvreau's high-point on the final route, placed second due to count-back to the semi-final results. François Petit claimed the bronze medal.

Women 
Martina Cufar won the Lead World Champion title. Muriel Sarkany placed second while Chloé Minoret placed third.

Bouldering

Men 
Mauro Calibani became the first ever male Bouldering World Champion. Frédéric Tuscan and Christian Core placed second and third respectively.

Women 
Myriam Motteau became the first ever female Bouldering World Champion. Sandrine Levet and Nataliya Perlova placed second and third respectively.

Speed

Men 
Maksym Styenkovyy claimed the Speed World Champion title. Vladimir Zakharov and Tomasz Oleksy placed second and third respectively.

Women 
Olena Ryepko claimed the Speed World Champion title. Mayya Piratinskaya and Svetlana Sutkina placed second and third respectively.

References 

IFSC Climbing World Championships
International sports competitions hosted by Switzerland
World Climbing Championships